Ramíro Mañalich (born 7 March 1887) was a Cuban fencer. He competed in the individual and team épée competitions at the 1924 Summer Olympics.

References

External links
 

1887 births
Year of death missing
Cuban male fencers
Olympic fencers of Cuba
Fencers at the 1924 Summer Olympics
Sportspeople from Havana